"Say It Again" was the 's entry for the Eurovision Song Contest 1999, written by Paul Varney and performed by girl band Precious. It was produced by Cutfather & Joe and included on the band's self-titled debut album (2000). "Say It Again" was released as a single in the United Kingdom on 17 May 1999 and peaked at number six on the UK Singles Chart. In July 2000, it was serviced to contemporary hit radio in the United States.

At Eurovision 
The song was performed 5th on the night of the contest, following 's Doris Dragović with "Marija Magdalena" and preceding 's Darja Švajger with "For a Thousand Years". The song received 38 points, placing 12th in a field of 23, it was one of the four which were omitted from the Eurovision 1999 compilation album as permission to include it had not been obtained. The song was succeeded as UK entry at the 2000 contest by Nicki French with "Don't Play That Song Again".

Track listings 
UK CD single
 "Say It Again" (Cutfather & Joe mix) – 2:59
 "Say It Again" (James Lavonz full vocal mix) – 4:40
 "Essential Love" – 3:35
 "Say It Again" (video version)

UK cassette single
 "Say It Again" (Cutfather & Joe mix) – 2:59
 "Say It Again" (James Lavonz full vocal mix) – 4:40
 "Essential Love" – 3:35

European CD single
 "Say It Again" (Cutfather & Joe mix) – 2:59
 "Say It Again" (James Lavonz full vocal mix) – 4:35

Charts

Release history

References 

1999 debut singles
1999 songs
Capitol Records singles
EMI Records singles
Eurovision songs of 1999
Eurovision songs of the United Kingdom
Song recordings produced by Cutfather & Joe